Axel Bamba (born 6 July 1999) is a professional footballer who plays as a defender for Spanish club Sporting Gijón. Born in Switzerland, he represents Ivory Coast at international level.

Club career
Bamba joined the youth academy of Paris FC in 2010, and worked his way up to the senior team. He made his professional debut with Paris FC in a 0–0 (4–3) Coupe de la Ligue penalty shootout win over AC Ajaccio on 14 August 2018.

On 30 August 2022, Bamba signed a three-year contract with Sporting de Gijón in the Spanish Segunda División.

International career
Bamba was born in Switzerland, where his Ivorian father Yacouba Bamba was playing football for FC Zürich, and moved to France at the a young age. Despite interest from the French youth teams, Bamba declared he would represent the Ivory Coast national team like his father.

Career statistics

Club

References

External links
 
 Paris FC Profile
 

1999 births
Living people
Footballers from Zürich
Ivorian footballers
Swiss men's footballers
Swiss people of Ivorian descent
Association football defenders
Paris FC players
Sporting de Gijón players
Ligue 2 players
Championnat National 3 players
Ivorian expatriate footballers
Ivorian expatriate sportspeople in France
Ivorian expatriate sportspeople in Spain
Swiss expatriate footballers
Swiss expatriate sportspeople in France
Swiss expatriate sportspeople in Spain
Expatriate footballers in France
Expatriate footballers in Spain